Suawala is a village of the Bijnor district, Uttar Pradesh, India. It is located at the border with the state of Uttarakhand. Pin Code is 246747.  Tehsil Dhampur and Block Afzalgarh.

Demographics
As of 2011 Indian Census, Suwala had a total population of 5,741, of which 3,050 were males and 2,691 were females. Population within the age group of 0 to 6 years was 752.

Location
Village is located in Dhampur Tehsil of Bijnor district in Uttar Pradesh, India. It is situated 22 km away from sub-district headquarter Dhampur and 67 km away from district headquarter Bijnor. As per 2009 stats, Suawala village is also a gram panchayat.

Climate

References

Villages in Bijnor district